The rubber-tyred metro systems that incorporate  track have angle irons as guide bars, or guiding bars, outside of the two roll ways. The Busan Subway Line 4, that lacks a rail track, has I-beams installed as guide bars. The flanges are vertical. The Sapporo Municipal Subway, that lacks a rail track as well, has no guide bars. It has a central guide rail instead. Guide bars are also used to provide guidance for guided buses.

See also 

 Automated guideway transit
 Bracket
 chainsaw
 Flangeways  
 Fourth rail 
 Guide rail
 Overhead conductor rail
 Rail profile
 Roll way
 Rail track
 The technology of rubber-tyred metros
 Third rail

References

External links 
 Visual dictionary
 TRUCK (bogie)

Rubber-tyred metros